Kojo Bonsu is a Ghanaian businessman, sports administrator and politician, who served as the Metropolitan Chief Executive (MCE) of the Kumasi Metropolitan Assembly (KMA) from 2013 to 2016. He is a member of the National Democratic Congress.

Early life and education 
Bonsu is a native of Offinso a town in the Ashanti Region of Ghana. He had his Ordinary Level education at the Tamale Secondary School, between 1974 and 1979. In 1981, Bonsu then moved to the Drayton School in London, England where he acquired his Advanced Level Certificate. Between 1985 and 1990, when Bonsu joined giant sports kit manufacturers, Adidas, he enrolled into their football Business Unit at Herzogenaurach, Germany, and in the process obtained a Diploma in Sports Business and Marketing.

Career

Early career 
After completing his training in sports Business and marketing, Bonsu worked with Adidas and became their first representative in West Africa and served as an Assistant Marketing Officer. He rose to become the kit maker's manager in Ghana and the whole of West Africa. Within which period he brokered deals between the company and the Ghana football Association specifically the Ghana football national team.

Football administration 
He is a former director of Tamale-based club Real Tamale United. Bonsu was also an executive member of Asante Kotoko. In 2003 he launched his bid to be the Ghana Football Association's President. He went against former president of the GFA Kwesi Nyantakyi, politician and executive member of Accra Hearts of Oak, Vincent Odotei Sowah, a former FA vice-chairman, Joseph Ade Coker and former executive council chairman, Y.A Ibrahim. He subsequently lost to Kwesi Nyantakyi in the elections in December 2005.
In January 2010, Bonsu was appointed board chairman of the National Sports Authority then a council under the Ministry of Youth and Sports. Bonsu is known to have spearheaded the re-branding of the sports council until it subsequently became a sports authority.

Managing Director of Goil 

Bonsu served as a board member for Ghana Oil Company (GOIL) from July 2009 to April 2015. He also became acting managing director of the company after their long serving managing director Yaw Agyemang-Duah retired after serving with the company for 16 years.

He served as managing director role from July 2011 to February 2012. In October 2015, He was acknowledged and honoured by the company for playing a key role in the company's rebranding process.

Mayor of Kumasi 
In 2013, then President, John Dramani Mahama nominated Bonsu for the position of Metropolitan Chief Executive for the Kumasi Metropolitan Assembly. In July 2016, he vacated his office and resigned after the Kumasi Traditional Council called him to order for his decision to take Nana Agyenim Boateng the Amoamanhene off the Kejetia project board without giving a notice to Otumfuo Nana Osei Tutu II, the Asantehene.

He is the founder and former publisher of Agoo Magazine an African lifestyle magazine that was founded in 2001.

Political career 
Ahead of the 2020 elections, in September 2018 towards the National Democratic Congress' Presidential primaries he declared his intention to contest as Party's president flagbearership role. In December 2018, he announced his decision to drop out of the race for the role and threw his support to whoever would emerge winner at the end of the primaries.

Personal life 
He is an avid supporter of Ghanaian-based club Asante Kotoko.

References 

Living people
People from Ashanti Region
Mayors of Kumasi
National Democratic Congress (Ghana) politicians
Year of birth missing (living people)
Tamale Senior High School alumni
Real Tamale United
Ghanaian football chairmen and investors